NES Play Action Football is a football video game developed by Tose and published by Nintendo for the Nintendo Entertainment System. It was released in 1990 in North America only. The game was also ported to the Game Boy as Play Action Football, and received a follow up on the Super NES titled Super Play Action Football in 1992 in North America only. It was released on the Wii Virtual Console in North America on September 10, 2007. The Virtual Console version was available as a Club Nintendo bonus download from August 19 to September 2, 2012.

Overview
NES Play Action Football allows players to choose from eight teams from various cities. For licensing reasons, the original game features only the city rather than the actual name of each NFL team and only the surnames and numbers (although a comprehensive set down to various position-specific levels on each depth chart) of actual players that were currently playing for the corresponding NFL team during the 1989 NFL season: Los Angeles, Denver, San Francisco, Washington, Miami, New York, Chicago, and Houston. In the Virtual Console re-release, the city names are replaced by country names, so Los Angeles is Japan, San Francisco is Italy, Miami is Mexico, Chicago is China, Denver is Korea, Washington is England, New York is Brazil, and Houston is U.S.A.

The game used an isometric view, presenting the game at an angle to make it appear 3-D, and the game allowed a very large number of moving objects (all the players) to be on screen at the same time. Another feature was the use of primitive digitized voices for such actions as "Touchdown!" or "First down!" and "Ready! Set! Hut, hut.." before the play begins. At the end of each game, Nintendo Power mascot character Nester appears as a commentator, announcing who wins and who loses.

The game was one of the few games that supported the NES Satellite and NES Four Score four controller adapters. To allow teammates to select plays without showing the competitors, it included a NES Play Action Football 4 player play card. The teammates could point to the plays they were going to pick on the card, and then enter the combination on-screen without the opposition knowing.

References

External links

NES Play Action Football at NinDB

1990 video games
Game Boy games
Nintendo Entertainment System games
Nintendo games
Play Action Football video games
Virtual Console games
North America-exclusive video games
Tose (company) games
Video games developed in Japan